Devil's Got a New Disguise: The Very Best of Aerosmith (known in the UK as The Very Best of Aerosmith) is a compilation album by American hard rock band Aerosmith released on October 17, 2006. It has sold more than 265,048 copies in the U.S. as of May 2008.

The album was intended to fulfill Aerosmith's contract with Sony Music/Columbia Records until a release of a new studio album, the first since 2001's Just Push Play but ultimately did not surface. However the long-awaited new album, Music from Another Dimension!, was finally released in November 2012.

Aerosmith had hoped to spend much of 2006 recording material for a new album, but the band had been hit with a number of setbacks during the year, including lead singer Steven Tyler requiring throat surgery in March 2006, bassist Tom Hamilton recovering from treatment for throat cancer, and conflict with their record company. Thus, as the band had been robbed of adequate time to create a quality album, they opted to release a best-of compilation instead.

The album features 18 Aerosmith hits in their single-remix versions, spanning their entire career, as well as two new songs: the title track, "Devil's Got a New Disguise", and "Sedona Sunrise."  "Devil's Got a New Disguise" was culled from outtakes from the Pump sessions, during which it was called "Susie Q" and had unfinished lyrics; later, during 1992's Get a Grip sessions, its title changed to "Devil's Got a New Disguise", it was co-written by Diane Warren and for the 2006 version few lines of the lyrics were changed. "Sedona Sunrise" was also culled from the Pump sessions co-written by Jim Vallance (The Other Side, Young Lust, etc.). "Devil's Got A New Disguise" is a straightforward rocker, while "Sedona Sunrise" is a very laidback, somewhat romantic blues-rock tune.

The European edition of the album was released on 30 October 2006 and it features 5 tracks different from the American version. These tracks are: "Amazing", "Angel", "Falling In Love (Is Hard on the Knees)", "Pink", and "The Other Side". The tracks that were on the American edition of the album but are not on the European edition of the album are: "Back in the Saddle", "Last Child", "Mama Kin", "Rag Doll" and "What It Takes".

In North America, the album debuted at number 33 on the Billboard 200, with 23,000 units sold, and had sold 75,000 copies by December 6, 2006.

American track listing (Devil's Got a New Disguise)
"Dream On" – from Aerosmith – 4:26
"Mama Kin" – from Aerosmith – 4:26
"Sweet Emotion" – from Toys in the Attic – 4:35
"Back in the Saddle" – from Rocks – 4:40
"Last Child" – from Rocks – 3:26
"Walk This Way (Run-DMC Version)" (single edit) – from Raising Hell – 3:45
"Dude (Looks Like a Lady)" – from Permanent Vacation – 4:22
"Rag Doll" – from Permanent Vacation – 4:25
"Love in an Elevator" – from Pump – 5:22
"Janie's Got a Gun" – from Pump – 5:30
"What It Takes" (CHR remix/edit) – from Pump – 4:08
"Crazy" (LP edit) – from Get a Grip – 4:05
"Livin' on the Edge" (closer to the edge CHR edit) – from Get a Grip – 4:21
"Cryin'" – from Get a Grip – 5:09
"I Don't Want to Miss a Thing" (pop mix) – from the Armageddon soundtrack – 4:28
"Jaded" – from Just Push Play – 3:35
"Sedona Sunrise" – 4:18
"Devil's Got a New Disguise" – 4:27

United Kingdom track listing (The Very Best of Aerosmith)
"Dude (Looks Like a Lady)" – from Permanent Vacation – 4:22
"Love in an Elevator" – from Pump – 5:22
"Livin' on the Edge" (AOR video edit) – from Get a Grip – 5:06
"Walk This Way (Run-DMC Version)" (single edit) – from Raising Hell – 3:45
"Cryin'" – from Get a Grip – 5:09
"Jaded" – from Just Push Play – 3:35
"Crazy" (LP edit) – from Get a Grip – 4:05
"Angel" – from Permanent Vacation – 5:06
"Janie's Got a Gun" (CHR remix) – from Pump – 4:32
"Amazing" – from Get a Grip – 5:57
"The Other Side" – from Pump – 4:07
"Dream On" – from Aerosmith – 4:26
"Sweet Emotion" – Single Edit from Toys in the Attic – 3:13
"Falling in Love (Is Hard on the Knees)" – from Nine Lives
"Pink" – from Nine Lives
"I Don't Want to Miss a Thing" (pop mix) – from the Armageddon soundtrack – 4:28
"Sedona Sunrise" – 4:18
"Devil's Got a New Disguise" – 4:27

Japan track listing
"Dude (Looks Like a Lady)" – from Permanent Vacation – 4:22
"Love in an Elevator" – from Pump – 5:22
"Livin' on the Edge" (AOR video edit) – from Get a Grip – 5:06
"Walk This Way (Run-DMC Version)" (single edit) – from Raising Hell – 3:45
"Cryin'" – from Get a Grip – 5:09
"Jaded" – from Just Push Play – 3:35
"Crazy" (LP edit) – from Get a Grip – 4:05
"Angel" – from Permanent Vacation – 5:06
"Amazing" – from Get a Grip – 5:57
"The Other Side" – from Pump – 4:07
"Dream On" – from Aerosmith – 4:26
"Sweet Emotion" – Single Edit from Toys in the Attic – 3:13
"Draw the Line" – from Draw the Line – 3:25
"Falling in Love (Is Hard on the Knees)" – from Nine Lives - 3:25
"Pink" – from Nine Lives - 3:56
"I Don't Want to Miss a Thing" – from the Armageddon soundtrack – 4:58
"Sedona Sunrise" – 4:18
"Devil's Got a New Disguise" – 4:27

Personnel
Steven Tyler – lead vocals, harmonica, piano
Tom Hamilton – bass
Joey Kramer – drums
Joe Perry – lead and rhythm guitar, backing vocals, pedal steel guitar, talkbox
Brad Whitford – rhythm and lead guitar, acoustic guitar

Charts

Weekly charts

Year-end charts

Certifications

Release history

References 

2006 greatest hits albums
Aerosmith compilation albums
Columbia Records compilation albums
Sony Records compilation albums
Albums produced by Bruce Fairbairn
Albums produced by Mark Hudson (musician)
Albums produced by Kevin Shirley
Albums produced by Marti Frederiksen
Albums produced by Jack Douglas (record producer)